Rika Hiraki (born 6 December 1971) is a former professional Japanese tennis player.

She won the mixed-doubles title at the 1997 French Open (with Mahesh Bhupathi).

Biography
Started playing at age 6. Baseliner, who considered groundstrokes her strength. Father, Koichi, works for Japan Airlines; mother, Noriko, is a homemaker; older brother, Yasuchika, graduated from the University of Tokyo and is now a pilot with Japan Airlines. Graduated from Aoyama Gakuin University, majoring in International Politics. Works as a Systems Manager for telephone company NTT, completing all her work from the road via computer modem while at tournaments. Hobbies include reading and working with computers. Likes to visit London. Favorite movie is Beaches; favorite color is red. Enjoys swimming and listening to music.

Grand Slam finals

Mixed doubles: (1 title)

WTA career finals

Doubles (6–7)

ITF finals

Singles (1–3)

Doubles (10–13)

External links
 
 
 

1971 births
Living people
Aoyama Gakuin University alumni
French Open champions
Japanese female tennis players
Sportspeople from Beirut
Asian Games medalists in tennis
Grand Slam (tennis) champions in mixed doubles
Tennis players at the 1998 Asian Games
Universiade medalists in tennis
Medalists at the 1998 Asian Games
Asian Games bronze medalists for Japan
Universiade gold medalists for Japan
Universiade silver medalists for Japan
Medalists at the 1991 Summer Universiade
Medalists at the 1993 Summer Universiade
Medalists at the 1995 Summer Universiade